Dentiraja endeavouri, the Endeavour skate, is a species of skate of the family Rajidae native waters off eastern Australia – Queensland and New South Wales.

Its a saltwater marine species commonly found in the Pacific Ocean, off the coast of Australia.

References 

Rajiformes
Marine fish of Southern Australia
Fish described in 2008
Taxa named by Peter R. Last